Nahravan may refer to:
 Nahrawan Canal, an ancient Persian irrigation system in modern-day Iraq
Nahravan, Iran, a village in Zanjan Province, Iran